This article gives a list of the territories of the dioceses of the Catholic Church in India.

Each diocese is administered by a bishop. Dioceses are further grouped into ecclesiastical provinces. The most important diocese of the province is the archdiocese and the bishop of this diocese is an archbishop. While they each usually consist of a few Indian civil districts, dioceses can range in size from just a portion of a district to spanning entire states. The civil district should not be confused with ecclesiastical district or deanery, which is another type of subdivision of a diocese.

All Catholics in India are under the authority of the respective Syro-Malankara, Syro-Malabar or Latin bishop. Only in the Syro-Malabar dioceses of Adilabad, Bijnor, Chanda, Gorakhpur, Jagdalpur, Rajkot, Sagar, Satna and Ujjain, the authority of the Syro-Malabar bishop is over both, Syro-Malabar and Latin rite Catholics.

In the following, the names listed after the name of the state or union territory are the names of civil districts, unless otherwise mentioned. Some newly-created districts may be missing from this list.

Latin Ecclesiastical Provinces

Province of Agra
 Archdiocese of Agra
Uttar Pradesh: Agra, Aligarh, Auraiya, Budaun, Bulandshahr, Etah, Etawah, Farrukhabad, Firozabad, Gautam Buddh Nagar, Hathras, Kannauj, Kasganj, Mainpuri and Mathura
Rajasthan: Bharatpur and Dholpur

 Diocese of Ajmer
Rajasthan: Ajmer, Jodhpur, Kota, Barmer, Bundi, Jalore, Jhalawar, Pali, Sirohi, Tonk, Jaisalmer and Baran

 Diocese of Allahabad
Uttar Pradesh: Allahabad, Ambedkar Nagar, Faizabad, Fatehpur, Kanpur City, Kanpur Dehat (Akbarpur), Kaushambi, Mirzapur, Pratapgarh, Raebareli, Sonbhadra and Sultanpur
 Diocese of Bareilly
Uttar Pradesh: Bareilly, Shahjahanpur and Pilibhit
Uttarakhand: Almora, Bageshwar, Champawat, Nainital, Pithoragarh and Udham Singh Nagar
 Diocese of Bijnor
Uttar Pradesh: Bijnor (except Dhampur division)
Uttarakhand: Pauri Garhwal, Rudraprayag, Tehri Garhwal, Chamoli, Uttarkashi and a portion of Haridwar
 Diocese of Gorakhpur
 Uttar Pradesh: Gorakhpur, Deoria, Sant Kabir Nagar, Basti, Kushinagar, Maharajganj and Siddharthnagar
 Diocese of Jaipur
Rajasthan: Jaipur, Karauli, Sawai Madhopur, Dausa, Alwar, Sikar, Jhunjhunu, Bikaner, Nagaur, Churu, Hanumangarh and Sri Ganganagar
 Diocese of Jhansi
Uttar Pradesh: Jhansi, Lalitpur, Jalaun, Banda, Chitrakoot, Hamirpur and Mahoba
 Diocese of Lucknow
Uttar Pradesh: Lucknow, Unnao, Barabanki, Gonda, Bahraich, Sitapur, Hardoi, Balrampur, Shravasti and Kheri
 Diocese of Meerut
Uttar Pradesh: Meerut, Muzaffarnagar, Saharanpur, Moradabad, Rampur, Jyotiba Phule Nagar, Ghaziabad, Baghpat and the Tehsil of Dhampur of Bijnor
Uttarakhand: Dehradun and Haridwar
 Diocese of Udaipur
 Rajasthan: Udaipur, Rajsamand, Bhilwara, Chittorgarh, Dungarpur, Pratapgarh and Banswara
 Madhya Pradesh: Tehsil of Thandla (Jhabua district)
 Diocese of Varanasi
 Uttar Pradesh: Varanasi, Azamgarh, Ballia, Bhadohi, Chandauli, Ghazipur, Jaunpur and Mau

Province of Bangalore
Archdiocese of Bangalore
Karnataka: Bangalore, Kolar, Bangalore rural, Chikbulapur, Ramanagara and Tumkur
 Diocese of Belgaum
Karnataka: Belgaum, Bagalkot, Dharwad, Gadag and Haveri
Maharashtra: Chandgad taluka in Kolhapur District
 Diocese of Bellary
Karnataka: Bellary, Raichur and Koppal
 Diocese of Chikmagalur
Karnataka: Chikmagalur and Hassan
 Diocese of Gulbarga
Karnataka: Bidar, Kalaburagi and Bijapur
 Diocese of Karwar
Karnataka: Uttara Kannada (North Canara)

 Diocese of Mangalore
Karnataka: Dakshina Kannada (South Canara)
Kerala: Kasargod and Manjeshwaram talukas of Kasargod
 Diocese of Mysore
Karnataka: Mysore, Mandya, Coorg and Chamarajanagar
 Diocese of Shimoga
Karnataka: Shimoga, Chitradurga and Davangere
 Diocese of Udupi
Karnataka: Udupi

Province of Bhopal
Archdiocese of Bhopal
Madhya Pradesh: Bhopal, Harda, Hoshangabad and Sehore
 Diocese of Gwalior
Madhya Pradesh: Bhind, Datia, Gwalior, Morena, Sheopur and Shivpuri
 Diocese of Indore
Madhya Pradesh: Indore, Dewas and Dhar except the Tehshil of Sardarpur
 Diocese of Jabalpur
Madhya Pradesh: Jabalpur, Damoh, Mandla, Shahdol, Narsinghpur, Dindori, Umaria, Katni, Anuppur and the Tahsil of Lakhnadon in Seoni district
 Diocese of Jhabua
Madhya Pradesh: Jhabua, Alirajpur, Ratlam, Mandsaur, Neemuch and Sardarpur Tehsil of Dhar district

 Diocese of Khandwa
Madhya Pradesh: Khandwa (East Nimar), Bhurhanpur, Barwani and Khargone (West Nimar)
 Diocese of Sagar
Madhya Pradesh: Sagar, Raisen, Vidisha, Ashoknagar and Guna
 Diocese of Satna
Madhya Pradesh: Chhatarpur, Rewa, Panna, Satna, Sidhi, Tikamgarh and Singrauli
 Diocese of Ujjain
Madhya Pradesh: Ujjain, Shajapur and Rajgarh

Province of Bombay

Archdiocese of Bombay
Maharashtra: Mumbai City, Mumbai Suburban, Raigad and Thane except Bhiwandi and Shahapur talukas
Syro-Malabar Diocese of Kalyan
 Maharashtra: Mumbai City, Mumbai Suburban, Thane, Raigad, Pune, Kolhapur, Satara, Solapur, Sangli, Sindhudurg, Ratnagiri, Nasik, Dhule, Jalgaon, Nandurbar and Ahmednagar

 Diocese of Nashik
 Maharashtra: Nashik, Dhule, Jalgaon, Nandurbar and Ahmednagar
 Diocese of Poona
Maharashtra: Pune, Sangli, Satara and Solapur and the parish of Kolhapur
 Diocese of Vasai
Maharashtra: Palghar district and Bhiwandi and Shahapur talukas of Thane

Province of Calcutta

Archdiocese of Calcutta
West Bengal: Kolkata, North 24 Parganas, Howrah, Hooghly, East Midnapore and West Midnapore and parts of Bankura.
 Diocese of Asansol
West Bengal: Burdwan district, nine blocks of Bankura district and 10 blocks of Birbhum district
 Diocese of Bagdogra
West Bengal: One sub-division (Siliguri) and part of another (Kurseong) among the four sub-divisions of Darjeeling district
 Diocese of Baruipur
West Bengal: South 24 Parganas district, small parts of Kolkata and of North 24 Parganas district
 Diocese of Darjeeling
West Bengal: Three hill sub-divisions of Darjeeling district: Darjeeling, Kurseong and Kalimpong
Sikkim: Entire state
Kingdom of Bhutan: Entire country
 Diocese of Jalpaiguri
West Bengal: Jalpaiguri and Cooch Behar
 Diocese of Krishnagar
West Bengal: Nadia and Murshidabad
 Diocese of Raiganj
West Bengal: North Dinajpur, South Dinajpur and Malda

Province of Cuttack-Bhubaneswar
Archdiocese of Cuttack-Bhubaneswar
Orissa: Cuttack, Jajpur, Jagatsinghpur, Kendrapara, Khurda, Phulbani (Kandhamal), Boudh, Nayagarh and Puri
 Diocese of Balasore
Orissa: Bhadrak, Balasore, Mayurbhanj and Keonjhar
 Diocese of Berhampur
Orissa: Ganjam and Gajapati
 Diocese of Rayagada
Orissa: Nuapada, Koraput, Rayagada, Nabarangapur, Malkangiri and Kalahandi
 Diocese of Rourkela
Orissa: Sundergarh
 Diocese of Sambalpur
Orissa: Sambalpur, Anugul, Bargarh, Balangir, Debagarh, Dhenkanal, Jharsuguda and Sonapur

Province of Delhi

Archdiocese of Delhi
Delhi: Entire National Capital Territory
Haryana: Faridabad, Gurgaon, Jhajjar, Mahendragarh, Nuh, Rewari, Rohtak and Sonepat

 Diocese of Jammu-Srinagar
Jammu and Kashmir: Entire union territory 
Ladakh: Entire union territory
 Diocese of Jalandhar
Punjab: Amritsar, Faridkot, Ferozepore, Fazilka, Gurdaspur, Hoshiarpur, Jalandhar, Kapurthala, Ludhiana, Moga, Muktsar, Nawanshahar, Tarn Taran and Pathankot districts and Anandpur Sahib tehsil of Ropar district
Himachal Pradesh: Chamba, Hamirpur, Kangra and Una
 Diocese of Simla and Chandigarh
Himachal Pradesh: Kinnaur, Lahaul-Spiti, Kullu, Mandi, Bilaspur, Shimla, Solan and Sirmour
Haryana: Panchkula, Ambala, Yamunanagar, Kurukshetra, Karnal, Panipat, Kaithal, Jind, Hissar, Bhiwani, Fatehabad and Sirsa
Punjab: Patiala, Sangrur, Mansa, Bhatinda, Fatehgarh Sahib, Barnala and Ropar
Chandigarh: Entire union territory

Province of Gandhinagar
Archdiocese of Gandhinagar
Gujarat: Gandhinagar, Mehsana, Patan, Banaskantha and Sabarkantha
 Diocese of Ahmedabad
Gujarat: Ahmedabad, Anand and Nadiad
 Diocese of Baroda
Gujarat: Bharuch, Dahod, Dangs, Godhra, Narmada, Navsari, Surat, Tapi, Vadodara and Valsad
 Diocese of Rajkot
Gujarat: Amreli, Bhavnagar, Jamnagar, Junagadh, Porbandar, Rajkot, Surendranagar and Kutchch

Province of Goa and Daman

Archdiocese of Goa and Daman
Goa: Entire state
Dadra and Nagar Haveli and Daman and Diu: Entire union territory
 Diocese of Sindhudurg
Maharashtra: Ratnagiri and Sindhudurg districts and Kolhapur district (except the city of Kolhapur)

Province of Guwahati
Archdiocese of Guwahati
Assam: Nagaon, Morigaon, Kamrup, Kamrup Metropolitan and Goalpara
 Diocese of Bongaigaon
Assam: Nalbari, Barpeta, Bongaigaon, Kokrajhar, Chirang, Baksa and Dhubri
 Diocese of Dibrugarh
Assam: Tinsukia, Dibrugarh, Sivasagar, Jorhat and Golaghat
 Diocese of Diphu
Assam: Karbi Anglong, North Cachar Hills

 Diocese of Itanagar
Arunachal Pradesh: Tawang, West Kameng, East Kameng, Papum Pare, Upper Subansiri, Lower Subansiri, Kurung Kumey, West Siang, East Siang and Upper Siang
 Diocese of Miao
Arunachal Pradesh: Changlang, Upper Dibang valley, Lower Dibang valley, Anjaw, Lohit and Tirap
 Diocese of Tezpur
Assam: Darrang, Udalguri, Sonitpur, Lakhimpur and Dhemaji on the North bank of the Brahmaputra; Rupahihat, Kaliabor and Samuguri Subdivisions of Nagaon on the Southern Bank of Brahmaputra

Province of Hyderabad
Archdiocese of Hyderabad
Telangana: Hyderabad, Ranga Reddy, Medak and Nizamabad
 Diocese of Adilabad
Telangana: Adilabad
 Diocese of Cuddapah
Andhra Pradesh: Cuddapah and Chittoor
 Diocese of Khammam
Telangana: Khammam
 Diocese of Kurnool
Andhra Pradesh: Kurnool and Anantpur
 Diocese of Nalgonda
Telangana: Nalgonda and Mahabubnagar
 Diocese of Warangal
Telangana: Warangal and Karimnagar

Province of Imphal

Archdiocese of Imphal
Manipur: entire state
 Diocese of Kohima
Nagaland: Entire state

Province of Madras and Mylapore
Archdiocese of Madras and Mylapore
Tamil Nadu: City of Chennai and Thiruvallur 
 Diocese of Chingleput
Tamil Nadu: Kanchipuram, Chengalpattu and smaller parts of City of Chennai and Viluppuram.
 Diocese of Coimbatore
Tamil Nadu: Coimbatore, Tiruppur, Erode, Karur
Kerala: A small portion of Chittur taluk of Palakkad
 Diocese of Ootacamund
Tamil Nadu: Nilgiris, parts of Erode and a small portion of Coimbatore district which lies north of the River Bhavani
 Diocese of Vellore
Tamil Nadu: Vellore, Tirupattur, Ranipet, Tiruvannamalai and Arakkonam taluk of Tiruvallur

Province of Madurai
Archdiocese of Madurai
Tamil Nadu: Madurai, Virudhunagar, Theni and four taluks - Nilakkottai, Kodaikanal, Batlagundu, Natham and four parishes in Dindigul taluk of Dindigul district
 Diocese of Dindigul
Tamil Nadu: remaining parts of Dindigul district
 Diocese of Kottar
Tamil Nadu: taluks of Thovalai, Agasteeswaram (minus the parish of Azhagappapuram, Rajakrishanapuram  and Anjugramam) and Small portion Coastal Area of Vilavancode taluk of Kanyakumari district
 Diocese of Kuzhithurai
Tamil Nadu: taluks of Kalkulam and Vilavancode (minus seven villages along the coast belonging to the archdiocese of Trivandrum) of Kanyakumari district

 Diocese of Palayamkottai
Tamil Nadu: Ambai and Tirunelveli taluks of Tirunelveli district, full area of Tenkasi district, Kovilpatti and Kayathar taluks of Tuticorin district
 Diocese of Sivagangai
Tamil Nadu: Ramanathapuram and Sivagangai district.
 Diocese of Tiruchirapalli
Tamil Nadu: Southern Parts of Trichy City and Tiruchirapalli district and Northan parts of Pudukottai district and Small part of Karur district
 Diocese of Tuticorin
Tamil Nadu: Tuticorin district (Except Kovilpatti and Kayathar taluk), Nanguneri and Radhapuram taluks of Tirunelveli district and three parishes from Agasteeswaram taluk of Kanyakumari district

Province of Nagpur
Archdiocese of Nagpur
Maharashtra: Nagpur, Gondia and Bhandara
Madhya Pradesh: Betul, Chhindwara, Seoni (except the tehsil of Lakhnadon) and Balaghat
 Diocese of Amravati
Maharashtra: Amravati, Akola, Buldana, Washim and Yavatmal
 Diocese of Aurangabad
Maharashtra: Aurangabad, Jalna, Parbhani, Nanded, Latur, Bhir, Hingoli and Osmanabad
 Diocese of Chanda
Maharashtra: Wardha, Chandrapur and Gadchiroli

Province of Patna
Archdiocese of Patna
Bihar: Aurangabad, Patna, Nalanda, Nawada, Lakhisarai, Sheikhpura, Arwal, Gaya, Jehanabad, parts of Jamui and Munger
 Diocese of Bettiah
Bihar: West Champaran, East Champaran, Gopalganj, Saran and Siwan
 Diocese of Bhagalpur
Bihar: Bhagalpur, Banka, Jamui, and parts of Munger
Jharkhand: Godda, Deoghar, Giridih and parts of Sahebganj
 Diocese of Buxar
Bihar: Bhojpur, Buxar, Kaimur and Rohtas

 Diocese of Muzaffarpur
Bihar: Vaishali, Samastipur, Sitamarhi, Darbhanga, Madhubani, Saharsa, Begusarai, Muzaffarpur, Khagaria, Sheohar, Madhepura and Supaul
 Diocese of Purnea
Bihar: Purnea, Katihar, Kishanganj and Araria

Province of Pondicherry and Cuddalore

Archdiocese of Pondicherry and Cuddalore
Puducherry: Pondicherry and Karaikal
Tamil Nadu: Taluks of Cuddalore, Panruti, Vridhachalam, Tittagudi and Chidambaram (exclusive of area south of the Vellar River) of the South Arcot, and the Villupuram, Gingee, Tindivanam, Vanur, Tirukkovilur, Ulundurpet, Kallakurichi and Sankarapuram taluks of Villupuram

Diocese of Dharmapuri
Tamil Nadu: Dharmapuri, Krishnagiri
Diocese of Kumbakonam
Tamil Nadu: 12 taluks from 5 districts of Tiruchirapalli, Thanjavur, Perambalur, Ariyalur, Thiruvarur, Cuddalore district, a small portion of Thiruvannamalai and North part of Trichy City 
Diocese of Salem
Tamil Nadu: Salem and Namakkal
Diocese of Tanjore
Tamil Nadu: Thanjavur(except for the two taluks Papanasam and Kumbakonam in Thanjavur), Thiruvarur, Nagapattinam and Mayiladuthurai  and six taluks of Pudukottai.

Province of Raipur

Archdiocese of Raipur
Chhattisgarh: Raipur, Bilaspur, Mahasamund, Durg, Dhamtari, Korba, Janjgir, Kawardha, Bemetara, Balod, Baloda Bazar, Gariyaband, Mungeli and Rajnandgaon
 Diocese of Ambikapur
Chhattisgarh: Surguja, Surajpur, Balrampur and Korea
 Diocese of Jagdalpur
Chhattisgarh: Bastar, Kanker, Bijapur, Narayanpur, Dantewada, Kondagaon and Sukma
 Diocese of Jashpur
Chhattisgarh: Jashpur

 Diocese of Raigarh
Chhattisgarh: Raigarh

Province of Ranchi

Archdiocese of Ranchi
Jharkhand: Ranchi and Lohardaga
 Diocese of Daltonganj
 Jharkhand: Palamau, Garhwa and Latehar
 Diocese of Dumka
Jharkhand: Dumka, Sahibganj, Pakur, Jamtara and Madhupur subdivision of Deoghar
West Bengal: Rampurhat sub-division of Birbhum
 Diocese of Gumla
 Jharkhand: Gumla and part of Simdega
 Diocese of Hazaribag
Jharkhand: Chatra, Hazaribag, Ramgarh, Koderma and Bokaro excluding, the Chandankiyari block of Bokaro district together with that portion of Chas block which lies to the east of National Highway 32
 Diocese of Jamshedpur
 Jharkhand: East Singhbhum, West Singhbhum (excluding the parish of Bandgoan), Seraikela Kharsawan, Dhanbad, a portion of Bokaro district (namely the Chandankiyari Block and the Chas Block which lie East of National Highway 32)
West Bengal: Purulia
 Diocese of Khunti
 Jharkhand: Khunti

 Diocese of Port Blair
Andaman and Nicobar Islands: Entire union territory
 Diocese of Simdega
Jharkhand: Simdega

Province of Shillong
Archdiocese of Shillong
Meghalaya: East Khasi Hills and Ri Bhoi
 Diocese of Agartala
 Tripura:Entire state
 Diocese of Aizawl
Assam: Cachar, Hailakandi and Karimganj
Mizoram: Entire state
 Diocese of Jowai
Meghalaya: Jaintia Hills, East Jaintia Hills (Khliehriat)
 Diocese of Nongstoin
 Meghalaya: West Khasi Hills, South West Khasi Hills (Mawkyrwat)
 Diocese of Tura
 Meghalaya: East Garo Hills, North Garo Hills, South Garo Hills, West Garo Hills, South West Garo Hills (Ampati) and the part of Goalpara district south of Brahmaputra River

Province of Thiruvananthapuram
 Archdiocese of Thiruvananthapuram
Kerala: Trivandrum and Chirayinkil taluks of Thiruvananthapuram district with a small strip of coastal belt from Kovalam to Pozhiyoor in Neyyattinkara taluk
Tamil Nadu: Neerody to Erayumanthurai of Kanyakumari district
 Diocese of Alleppey
Kerala: Alleppey and Ernakulam

 Diocese of Neyyattinkara
Kerala: Neyyattinkara and Nedumangad taluks of Thiruvananthapuram district
 Diocese of Punalur
Kerala: Pathanamthitta district, Chengannur and Mavelikara talukas of Alappuzha district, Kottarakara, Kunnathur, Pathanapuram and Karunagappally talukas of Kollam district
 Diocese of Quilon
Kerala: Kollam district, the taluk of Karthikapally, portions of the taluks of Mavelikara and Chengannur which lie south of the river Pamba, in Alappuzha district

Province of Verapoly
 Archdiocese or Verapoly
Kerala: Ernakulam
 Diocese of Calicut
Kerala: Malappuram, Calicut and Wayanad
Puducherry: Mahe

 Diocese of Cochin
 Kerala: The territory of the Diocese of Cochin is situated between the Arabian Sea in the west, the Archdiocese of Verapoly in the north and in the east, and the Diocese of Alleppey in the south
 Diocese of Kannur
Kerala: Kannur (to the north of Mahé River, excluding the territory of the municipality of Mahe) and Kasargod (south of the Chandragiri river)
 Diocese of Kottapuram
Kerala:  Spread across Ernakulam, Trichur, Malapuram and Palakkad
 Diocese of Sultanpet
Kerala: Palakkad
 Diocese of Vijayapuram
Kerala: Kottayam, Idukki and partial portions of Alleppey, Ernakulam and Pathanamthitta

Province of Visakhapatnam
Archdiocese of Visakhapatnam
Andhra Pradesh: Visakhapatnam, East Godavari and part of Vizianagaram

 Diocese of Eluru
Andhra Pradesh: West Godavari and the Mandals of Amalapuram, Kothapeta, Rajole and Mummidivaram of East Godavari
 Diocese of Guntur
Andhra Pradesh: Guntur district, Addanki Taluk of Prakasam district
 Diocese of Nellore
Andhra Pradesh: Nellore and Prakasam except Adoni taluk

 Diocese of Srikakulam
Andhra Pradesh: Srikakulam and taluks of Kurupam, Parvathipuram, Cheepurupalli and Gummalakshmipuram of Vizianagaram
 Diocese of Vijayawada
Andhra Pradesh: Krishna

Syro-Malabar Ecclesiastical Provinces

Province of Eranakulam - Angamaly
Syro-Malabar Catholic Archdiocese of Eranakulam-Angamaly
Kerala: Almost the whole of Ernakulam, parts of Thrissur, Kottayam and Alleppey
Syro-Malabar Catholic Diocese of Idukki
Kerala: Devikulam taluk and parts of Idukki and Udumbanchola taluks of Idukki
Syro-Malabar Catholic Diocese of Kothamangalam
Kerala: Kothamangalam and Muvattupuzha taluks of Ernakulam and Thodupuzha taluk of Idukki

Province of Changanassery
Syro-Malabar Catholic Archdiocese of Changanassery
Kerala: Thiruvananthapuram, Kollam, Pathanamthitta, Alappuzha and Kottayam
Syro-Malabar Catholic Diocese of Kanjirappally
Kerala: Kottayam, Pathanamthitta districts and Peermade taluk of Idukki
Syro-Malabar Catholic Diocese of Palai
Kerala: Meenachil taluk of Kottayam and few villages of the neighboring taluks in Kottayam, Ernakulam and Idukki
Syro-Malabar Catholic Diocese of Thuckalay
Tamil Nadu: Kanyakumari, Madurai, Ramanathapuram, Sivaganga, Theni, Thoothukudi, Tirunelveli and Virudhunagar

Province of Tellicherry
Syro-Malabar Catholic Archdiocese of Tellicherry
Kerala: Kannur and Kasargode
Syro-Malabar Catholic Diocese of Belthangady
Karnataka: Kodagu, Dakshina Kannada and Udupi
Syro-Malabar Catholic Diocese of Bhadravathi
Karnataka: Shimoga and Chikmagalore
Syro-Malabar Catholic Diocese of Mananthavady
Kerala: Wayanad and parts of Malapuram and Kannur
Tamil Nadu: Nilgiris

Syro-Malabar Catholic Diocese of Mandya
Karnataka: Mandya, Hassan, Mysore, Chamarajnagar, Bangalore Urban, Bangalore Rural, Chickballapur, Kolar, Tumkur and Ramnagara
Syro-Malabar Catholic Diocese of Thamarassery
Kerala: Calicut and Malappuram

Province of Thrissur
Syro-Malabar Catholic Archdiocese of Thrissur
Kerala: Trichur district from Karuvannur River in the south till Bharathapuzha River in Malappuram in the north
Syro-Malabar Catholic Diocese of Ramanathapuram
Tamil Nadu: Ariyalur, Coimbatore, Dindigul, Erode, Karur, Nagapattinam, Namakkal, Perambalur, Pudukkottai, Salem, Thanjavur, Tiruchirappalli, Tiruppur and Tiruvarur
Syro-Malabar Catholic Diocese of Irinjalakuda
Kerala: Southern part of Thrissur, between the Karuvannur River in the north and the Chalakudy River in the south
Syro-Malabar Catholic Diocese of Palghat
Kerala: Palakkad

Archdiocese of Kottayam
Syro-Malabar Catholic Archdiocese of Kottayam
The jurisdiction of the Bishop of Kottayam is over all Knanaya Catholics (Suddhists) of the territory of the Syro Malabar Church

Directly under the Holy See
Syro-Malabar Diocese of Faridabad
Delhi, Chandigarh, Ladakh: Entire union territories
Haryana, Punjab, Himachal Pradesh, Jammu and Kashmir: Entire states
Uttar Pradesh: Gautam Buddh Nagar and Ghaziabad
Syro-Malabar Diocese of Hosur
Tamil Nadu: Chennai, Cuddalore, Dharmapuri, Kanchipuram, Krishnagiri, Tiruvallur, Tiruvannamalai, Vellore and Viluppuram

Syro-Malabar Diocese of Shamshabad
Andhra Pradesh, Arunachal Pradesh, Assam, Bihar, Goa, Jharkhand, Manipur, Meghalaya, Mizoram, Nagaland, Orissa, Rajasthan, Sikkim, Tripura, and West Bengal: Entire states
Chhattisgarh: Entire state except the diocese of Jagdalpur
Gujarat: Entire state except the diocese of Rajkot
Karnataka: Entire state except the dioceses of Belthangady, Bhadravathi, and Mandya
Maharashtra: Entire state except the dioceses of Kalyan and Chanda 
Madhya Pradesh: Entire state except the dioceses of Sagar, Satna and Ujjain 
Telangana: Entire state except the diocese of Adilabad
Uttar Pradesh: Entire state except the dioceses of Bijnor and Gorakhpur
Uttarakhand : Entire state except the diocese of Bijnor
Andaman and Nicobar Islands, Dadra and Nagar Haveli and Daman and Diu, Lakshadweep: Entire union territories

Syro-Malankara Ecclesiastical Provinces

Province of Trivandrum
Syro-Malankara Major Archeparchy of Trivandrum
Kerala: Trivandrum except for the ecclesiastical districts of Parassala, Neyyattinkara and Kattakada, and parts of Kollam, Allapuzha and Pathanamthitta
Tamil Nadu: some parts of Nagorkoil in Kanyakumari
Syro-Malankara Eparchy of Marthandom
Tamil Nadu: Kanyakumari, Tiruchirappalli, Nagapattinam, Tiruvarur, Thanjavur, Pudukkottai, Dindigul, Madurai, Theni, Thoothukudi, Tenkasi, Tirunelveli, Perambalur, Virudhunagar, Ramanathapuram, Sivagangai, Cuddalore, Namakkal, Ariyalur, Mayiladuthurai and Karur
Syro-Malankara Eparchy of Mavelikara
Kerala: Alapuzha except for the portions that belong to the Archdiocese of Tiruvalla and parts of Kollam and Pathanamthitta
Syro-Malankara Eparchy of Parassala
Kerala: Ecclesiastical districts of Parassala, Neyyattinkara and Kattakada and two parishes in the ecclesiastical district of Thiruvananthapuram in Thiruvananthapuram district
Syro-Malankara Eparchy of Pathanamthitta
Kerala: Pathanamthitta

Province of Tiruvalla
Syro-Malankara Catholic Archeparchy of Tiruvalla
Kerala: Kottayam, Idukki and part of Pathanamthitta
Syro-Malankara Catholic Eparchy of Muvattupuzha
Kerala: Ernakulam, Thrissur and Palakkad
Tamil Nadu: Coimbatore, Tirupur and Erode 
Syro-Malankara Catholic Eparchy of Bathery
Kerala: Wayanad, Malapppuram, Kozhikode, Kannur and Kasargod
Tamil Nadu: Nilgiris
Syro-Malankara Catholic Eparchy of Puthur
Karnataka: Dakshina Kannada, Chamarajnagar, Chickmagalur, Hassan, Kodagu, Mandya, Mysore, Shimoga, Udupi, Uttara Kannada, Bangalore Rural, Ramanagara, Bangalore Urban, Tumakuru, Chikkaballapura and Kolar

Directly under the Synod of the Syro-Malankara Church
Syro-Malankara Catholic Eparchy of St. Ephrem of Khadki
Maharashtra, Goa, Andhra Pradesh and Telangana: Entire states
Karnataka: Bagalkote, Belgaum, Bijapur, Dharwad, Gadag, Haveri, Chitradurga, Davanagere, Ballari, Bidar, Kalaburagi, Koppal, Raichur and Yadagiri
Tamil Nadu: Chennai, Vellore, Tiruvannamalai, Viluppuram, Kancheepuram, Tiruvallur, Kallakurichi, Chengalpattu, Tirupattur, Ranipet, Salem, Dharmapuri and Krishnagiri

Directly under the Holy See
Syro-Malankara Catholic Eparchy of St. John Chrysostom of Gurgaon
Arunachal Pradesh, Assam, Bihar, Chhattisgarh, Gujarat, Haryana,  Himachal Pradesh, Jammu and Kashmir, Jharkhand, Madhya Pradesh,  Manipur, Meghalaya, Mizoram, Nagaland, Orissa, Punjab, Rajasthan, Sikkim, Tripura, Uttar Pradesh, Uttarakhand and West Bengal: Entire states
Delhi, Chandigarh, Ladakh: Entire union territories

See also
Catholic Church in India
List of Catholic dioceses in India
List of districts of India
List of cathedrals in India
List of Catholic bishops of India

References
CBCI dioceses page
UCAN India Diocesan Directory
GCatholic.org list of dioceses in India

India
India religion-related lists